The Consuming Flame: Open Exercises in Group Form is the twelfth studio album by experimental electronic music duo Matmos, released on August 21, 2020 through Thrill Jockey.

Critical reception 

The Consuming Flame received "universal acclaim" according to album review aggregator Metacritic.

Track listing 
The individual track titles are not listed on the physical edition or on streaming platforms, but are taken from Thrill Jockey's website.

References

External links 
 

2020 albums
Matmos albums
Thrill Jockey albums